Museu Aeroespacial is a national aviation museum located in the West Side of Rio de Janeiro, Brazil in the Administrative Region of Realengo. The place is known as "the Brazilian Aviation cradle".

Address
Av. Marechal Fontenelle, 2000 - Campo dos Afonsos (Realengo), Rio de Janeiro/RJ

History
The Museu Aeroespacial (Aerospace Museum) was inaugurated on 18 October 1976 at the installations of the old Escola de Aeronáutica (former Brazilian Air Force officer graduation school, replaced by the Academia da Força Aérea), at Afonsos Air Force Base—the "Cradle of Military Aviation", in the City of Rio de Janeiro, Estado do Rio de Janeiro, Brazil.

The idea of an "Aeronautical Museum" dates from 1943 when the Minister of Aeronautics, Dr. Salgado Filho, determined its organization, but the initial work and subsequent attempts were interrupted by lack of suitable space and installations.

Given the explanatory memorandum from Lieutenant Brigadier Joelmir Campos do Araripe Macedo, Minister of Aeronautics, President Emilio Garrastazu Medici established the nucleus of the Aerospace Museum on July 31, 1973, through Decree No. 72552. Building and hangar restoration started in January 1974, at the same time as the collection and restoration of aircraft, engines, weapons, documents, photographs, maps, paintings, memorabilia and other items of historical value.

The Aerospace Museum is part of the University of the Air Force's campus (UNIFA), being administratively subordinate to the Historic-Cultural Institute of Aeronautics (INCA) since 1986.

Exhibits
The following aircraft are on permanent display at the museum, some of them in flyable condition:

See also
List of aerospace museums

Notes

References
Ogden, Bob (2008). Aviation Museums and Collections of The Rest of the World. UK: Air-Britain.

External links

Museu Aeroespacial website

Museums in Rio de Janeiro (city)
Aerospace museums in Brazil
Museums established in 1976